Jacqueline Curtet (born 9 May 1955, in Toulouse) is a French former athlete, who specialized in the long jump.

Curtet took third in the long jump at the 1975 European Cup held in Nice.  In 1977, she won the gold medal at the Summer Universiade at Sofia, Bulgaria, with a jump of 6.38 m. She was a three-time participant at the European Athletics Indoor Championships, her best finish being fourth in 1978.

She won three outdoor French national long jump titles and six French national indoor titles. She improved three times the French record in the long jump, establishing successively 6.57 m in 1977 and 6.58 m and 6.62 m in 1978. She also held the French national record in the  4 × 100 m relay.

Her mother Yvonne Curtet was a former French long jump champion and also shared the honour of breaking the French record and representing France at the European Athletics Championships. They were the first mother/daughter combination to have competed in the same event at the European Championships.

After retiring from the sport she married and took the name Jacky Fréchet.

International competitions

National titles
 French Championships in Athletics
Long jump: 1974, 1976, 1978
French Indoor Championships in Athletics
Long jump: 1973, 1976, 1977, 1978, 1979, 1981

Personal records

References

 Docathlé 2003, pages 42, 43, 175, 214 et 397, FFA.

External links
 All-athletics profile



1955 births
Living people
Sportspeople from Toulouse
French female long jumpers
Universiade medalists in athletics (track and field)
Universiade gold medalists for France
Medalists at the 1975 Summer Universiade
Medalists at the 1977 Summer Universiade
Medalists at the 1979 Summer Universiade
20th-century French women
21st-century French women